Irina Falconi was the defending champion, but lost in the first round to Dalila Jakupović.

Francesca Schiavone won the title, defeating Lara Arruabarrena in the final, 6–4, 7–5. This was Schiavone's final WTA singles title before her retirement in 2018.

Seeds

Draw

Finals

Top half

Bottom half

Qualifying

Seeds

Qualifiers

Draw

First qualifier

Second qualifier

Third qualifier

Fourth qualifier

Fifth qualifier

Sixth qualifier

References
 Main Draw
 Qualifying Draw

Copa Sony Ericsson Colsanitas - Singles
2017 Singles